Barthwal is a toponymic surname, rather a sub-caste, of Garhwali Sarola Brahmins from Bareth, a village in Pauri Garhwal district of Uttarakhand. Most Barthwal are concentrated in the district. The deity of Barthwals is Bhairava, who rides on the dog Shvaana. 

Like many sub-castes of Garhwal, it is said that they are not native to Garhwal. One version (Rahul Sankrityayan's) has it that they descended from four brothers, each of whom settled in a different location in the Pauri district. Another version has it that they all originally belonged to the village Bareth in Dwarikhal, near Silogi.

Notable Barthwals
Pitamber Dutt Barthwal, First Doctorate of Literature or (D.Litt.) of India in Hindi
Vijaya Barthwal, Indian Politician
Romil Barthwal, Indian Mountaineer
Madhuri Barthwal, Indian Folk Singer
Sunil Barthwal, Commerce Secretary, IAS, Government of India

References 

Everester thanks the weather gods for a goggle-less summit
एवरेस्ट फतह कर चुके लेफ्टिनेंट कर्नल रोमिल बर्थवाल बोले- आगे बढ़ना है तो कंफर्ट जोन से बाहर निकलें
My hard work finally rewarded: Padma awardee Madhuri Barthwal
Sunil Barthwal takes charge as commerce secretary
Huge scope for India to move in global value chain systems: Commerce Secretary Sunil Barthwal

Surnames
Indian surnames
 Surnames of Indian origin
 Surnames of Hindustani origin
 Hindu surnames
 Himalayan peoples
 Social groups of India
 Social groups of Uttarakhand
 Brahmin communities of Uttarakhand
Toponymic surnames
People from Pauri Garhwal district